The 1976 Colgate Red Raiders football team was an American football team that represented Colgate University as an independent during the 1976 NCAA Division I football season. In its first season under head coach Frederick Dunlap, the team compiled an 8–2 record. Mark Murphy and Keith Polito were the team captains. 

The team played its home games at Andy Kerr Stadium in Hamilton, New York.

Schedule

Leading players 
Two trophies were awarded to the Red Raiders' most valuable players in 1976: 
 Keith Polito, wide receiver, received the Andy Kerr Trophy, awarded to the most valuable offensive player.
 Doug Curtis, linebacker, received the Hal W. Lahar Trophy, awarded to the most valuable defensive player.

Statistical leaders for the 1976 Red Raiders included: 
 Rushing: Pat Healy, 557 yards and 3 touchdowns on 141 attempts
 Passing: Bob Relph, 1,353 yards, 95 completions and 10 touchdowns on 201 attempts
 Receiving: Keith Polito, 555 yards and 6 touchdowns on 30 receptions
 Total offense: Bob Relph, 1,530 yards (1,353 passing, 177 rushing)
 Scoring: Jerry Andrewlavage, 51 points from 15 PATs and 12 field goals
 All-purpose yards: Bruce Malverty, 859 yards (418 rushing, 281 kickoff returning, 160 receiving)
 Tackles: Doug Curtis, 145 total tackles
 Sacks: Sid Harris, 6 quarterback sacks

References

Colgate
Colgate Raiders football seasons
Colgate Red Raiders football